Tower of God is a South Korean manhwa released as a webtoon written and illustrated by S.I.U. It has been serialized in Naver Corporation's webtoon platform Naver Webtoon since June 2010, with the individual chapters collected and published by Young Com into eleven volumes as of November 2022. Tower of God received official English translations by Line Webtoon beginning in July 2014.

It has received several mobile game adaptations and merchandise. In Japan, the web manhwa received an anime television series adaptation by Telecom Animation Film that first premiered on Naver Series On in South Korea, and aired in Japan immediately afterward. It originally aired from April to June 2020. Crunchyroll licensed and simulcasted the Japanese broadcast version of the anime for its streaming service. In August 2022, a second season was announced.

Synopsis

Setup
Tower of God centers around a boy named Twenty-Fifth Bam. It is notable that in Korea 'Bam' can mean 'Night' or 'Chestnut'. He has spent most of his life trapped beneath a vast and mysterious Tower, with only his close friend, Rachel, to keep him company. When Rachel enters the Tower, Bam is devastated. Somehow, Bam manages to open the door to the Tower. Now, he will go any distance to see Rachel again even if it means dying. When he enters the Tower, he meets allies that will help him up the tower.

Settings

The Tower
"The Tower" is a mysterious structure that is completely enclosed and hosts many unique environments. It is permeated by an element called "Shinsu", which has strange properties similar to magic in other comic universes. It is inhabited by many different intelligent species. Living on the top floors is associated with a higher status in the Tower and better living conditions. This is because ascension from one floor to the next is only allowed by passing increasingly difficult tests of strength, dexterity and wit. Regulars are any individuals from the Outer Tower chosen to climb the tower in the Inner Tower. Former Regulars who reach the top of the Tower are known as Rankers, and are generally much more powerful than others. Rankers are often put to work administering the lower floors. At the top of the Tower sit the "Ten Great Families", which form the governing body of the Tower. A figure known as King Jahad (or 'Zahard', in some translations) is the chief leader of this body.

Each floor is composed of three layers: an external Outer Tower which serves as the residential area, an Inner Tower where people are tested, and a Middle Area, which acts as a network linking each floor. Residents of each floor are given the chance to ascend, provided that they are deemed "worthy" of doing so by Headon, the First Floor's Guardian and caretaker of the Tower. Such people are referred to as "Chosen Regulars" in Tower of God. The Tower is sealed from the vast, unknown "Outside" by portentous, impenetrable doors. On rare occasions, extraordinary people are able to open the doors and enter the Tower. Such people are called "Irregulars" in the manhwa, and Twenty-Fifth Bam is one of them.

According to the author, each floor is the size of the North American continent. Each floor often has its own culture, language and governance systems, and it is not uncommon to have nations living in isolation and unaware of the existence of the tower.

Only Irregulars are exempt from the contract Jahad struck with the Tower Guardians that made him immortal. Thus, only an Irregular can kill Jahad. This fact drives much of the plot in Tower of God.

Shinsu
Shinsu (Hangul: 신수, RR: Shin-soo), roughly translated as "Divine Water", is a substance found within the Tower in varying concentrations on each floor. On the lower floors, Shinsu is diffuse and inconspicuous, similar to air. However, on higher floors, Shinsu increases in power and concentration, and is said to be viscous and flowing similarly to water. High Shinsu resistance is required to enter these floors. Residents in the tower must form a contract with the "administrator" of the respective floors in order to manipulate Shinsu.

Shinsu can be manipulated to enhance physical abilities, powerful weapons, and even manipulate the elements. Bang (Korean-방) is the number of discrete units of Shinsu control. The more Bangs someone handle, the better the ability to control shinsu. The size of the units is called Myeon (Korean-면), and the concentration is called Soo (Korean-수). Though used with varying degrees of explicitness and even conscious awareness, its use seems to be inextricable from combat within the Tower. Shinsu reinforcement (Korean-신수강화-shinsooganghwa) is a technique used to strengthen the body, and is commonly used by Regulars. Those who are strong with Shinsu have their aging slowed to the point where they become effectively immortal. It is unclear to what extent aging is slowed simply by living in the tower without training to use Shinsu.

Shinsu does not have a fixed flow, but there is a temporary flow. Using this flow to attack is called flow control. Expert wave controllers could destroy a village with this. Reverse flow control is used to strike back in the direction of the flow and to stop the opponent. Sometimes they are used simultaneously, attacking with flow control and protecting the body with reverse flow control. Flow control is a favored technique of Twenty-Fifth Bam.

However there are certain exceptions to rules regarding Shinsu. Individuals known as "Irregulars" seem to have a special connection with the tower, being able to use Shinsu with little to no constraints, regardless of whether or not they have contracts with the same administrators of the floors they're on or going to. One highly notable irregular known simply as "Enryu" even managed to kill the then administrator and guardian of the 43rd floor. A feat once thought to be impossible on the apparently false pretense that Administrators were thought to be immortal and otherwise infallible. This has led many of the tower's inhabitants to see irregulars as little more than highly destructive entities with unfathomable powers and abilities, as well as being regarded as calamities brought forth by the tower's prophecies in an effort to bring about change to the tower.

Because of their ability, irregulars are often heavily stigmatized and feared, even by inhabitants of the highest caliber within the tower known simply as "Rankers". Individuals that have reached the highest floor known to the tower's inhabitants. The current capabilities of Irregulars is such that even the upper echelon of Rankers known as "High Rankers" such as the Ten Great Families and even King Jahad, are extremely wary of them, especially so in King Jahad's case due to the nature of his contract with the Tower Guardians.

Positions
Most battles in the tower are done in teams. Each person in a team plays a certain role in battle, which are referred to as positions. There are five basic positions: fisherman (낚시꾼 nakksiggun), spear-bearer (창지기 changjigi), light-bearer (등대지기 deungdaejigi), scout (탐색꾼 tamsaekggun), and wave-controller (파도잡이 padojabi). Fishermen are direct fighters, spear-bearers are a fighting support class, light-bearers provide distant reconnaissance, scouts provide on-ground reconnaissance, and wave-controllers control Shinsu. There are other positions, such as guide, but they are rare.

Development
Author S.I.U. majored in visual arts education on a university level before being conscripted into the South Korean military. By the advice of a senior in the army, S.I.U. started drawing cartoons. During this period, S.I.U. drew "ten books" worth of practice cartoons, which formed the backbone of the Tower of God comic he later started to create for the Internet. S.I.U. already has major events and characters planned out, sometimes more than 8 years in advance, and often shares additional information on the Tower of God universe on his blogpost, after each chapter is published.

Media

Manhwa
Lee Jong-hui, also known by the pen-name S.I.U. ("Slave In Utero") launched Tower of God in Naver's webtoon platform Naver Webtoon on June 30, 2010. It is the first story in the "Talse Uzer" universe. As of February 2020, Tower of God has collected 4.5 billion views worldwide. Tower of God was one of the first webtoons to receive official English translations by WEBTOON in July 2014.

Its first and second collected volumes were released simultaneously by Young Com on November 12, 2019.

In November 2021, Wattpad announced that Tower of God would receive a print release in North America as part of their new Webtoon Unscrolled imprint.

Volume list

Game
In 2013, Naver released a mobile role-playing game on Google Play based on Tower of God, developed by Sunrise. The game drew in 120 million players shortly after its initial release. The Tower of God role-playing game's development continued for two years after its initial release, and the game saw a full commercial release in 2016. In February 2016, the game ranked in the top 5 most popular games on South Korea's version of Google Play. A cross-webtoon RPG game titled Hero Cantare was released in 2019, featuring Tower of God and other popular titles such as The God of High School and Hardcore Leveling Warrior.

Merchandise
Naver sells a variety of Tower of God merchandise, such as figurines. During the commercial release of the Tower of God role-playing game, Naver released limited edition items worth ₩30,000 South Korean Won.

Anime

An anime television series adaptation was initially announced at Seoul Comic-Con in August 2019, the series titled  began releasing in April 2020 simultaneously in Japan, South Korea, and the United States. It was produced by Telecom Animation Film, with Aniplex subsidiary Rialto Entertainment responsible for Japanese production, and Sola Entertainment providing production management. The anime series premiered in South Korea on April 1, 2020 on Naver Series On and Korean television network Aniplus, and aired from April 2 to June 24, 2020 on Japanese television. The series was directed by Takashi Sano with Hirokazu Hanai as assistant director. Erika Yoshida was in charge of series composition, Masashi Kudo and Miho Tanino were the series' character designers, and Kevin Penkin composed the soundtrack. Korean band Stray Kids performed the opening "Top", and ending theme song "Slump" in Japanese, English, and Korean for the respective language dubs. The series ran for 13 episodes.

Crunchyroll streamed the Japanese broadcast of the series as a co-production under its "Crunchyroll Originals" title. Viz Media has licensed the series for home video distribution in North America and has been released on Blu-ray on January 18, 2022.

In August 2022, during their industry panel at Crunchyroll Expo, Crunchyroll announced that a second season was in production.

Reception
Head of Line Webtoon Tom Akel stated in July 2015 that the manhwa's weekly installments are read by five million people.

On the original Korean platform, Tower of God is the most profitable series based on the paid preview system, where readers can buy up to 3 chapters in advance. It has been consistently topping the popularity rankings since its publication in 2010, with one of the chapters receiving over 1 million comments.

Notes

References

External links
 Tower of God on Naver Webtoon 
 Tower of God on Line Webtoon 
 Tower of God official anime website 
 

2010 webtoon debuts
2010s webtoons
2020 anime television series debuts
Action anime and manga
Action webtoons
Adventure webtoons
Anime based on manhwa
Crunchyroll Originals
Dark fantasy anime and manga
Fantasy webtoons
Manhwa titles
Mystery comics
Naver Comics titles
South Korean webtoons
TMS Entertainment
Television shows based on South Korean webtoons
Upcoming anime television series
Webtoons in print